WLCO (1530 AM) is a radio station broadcasting a classic rock format, as a simulcast of WQUS 103.1 FM Lapeer. Licensed to Lapeer, Michigan, it first began broadcasting under the WTHM call sign in 1962. Until December 2019, it broadcast a country music format using Westwood One's Real Country, which combines classic country favorites with select current titles. Prior to that, as WLSP, the station had aired satellite-fed adult standards from ABC (Timeless Classics), and, prior to that, Talk and Sports formats.

WTHM first went on the air November 16, 1962, adding an FM sister station on 103.1 in 1968. The WTHM call letters are derived from THuMb indicating that the signal covers the Thumb region of Michigan. WTHM-AM/FM was a full-service station featuring MOR/adult contemporary music. Later on the call letters on both AM and FM were switched to WDEY; the music format remained AC.

WDEY-AM/FM had been owned for many years by James Sommerville, who sold both to Covenant Communications in 1991. WDEY switched to a country format as "Country Gold" with the WWGZ calls in the early 1990s, before adopting an all-sports format and the new call letters WLSP in 1994.

Both WLSP and WRXF-FM were sold in December 2001 to Regent Communications (now Townsquare Media) for $1.3 million. Both stations then moved from their longtime location at 286 West Nepessing Street in Lapeer to join their new Regent affiliate stations at G-3338 East Bristol Road in the Flint suburb of Burton. WLSP dropped sports in 2002 for a talk format featuring programming from the Michigan Talk Radio Network, before switching to adult standards as "Unforgettable 1530" (using ABC Radio's "Stardust" format) in January 2004. The station adopted the "Real Country" format and WLCO calls on March 1, 2007.

On December 2, 2019, WLCO fell silent due to an equipment failure at the station's transmitter site. It returned to the air by September 20, 2020 simulcasting the classic rock format of sister station WQUS.

It operates from local sunrise to local sunset to protect Clear-channel station WCKY in Cincinnati, Ohio.

Effective March 3, 2022, Townsquare Media sold WLCO to Smile FM for $172,500.

References

Michiguide.com - WLCO History

External links

LCO
Classic rock radio stations in the United States
Radio stations established in 1962
1962 establishments in Michigan
LCO